The Sainsbury Wellcome Centre (SWC) is a neuroscience research institute located in London, United Kingdom. The SWC is part of University College London (UCL), but sits outside of the faculty structure. It is funded by the Gatsby Charitable Foundation and Wellcome.

Founded in 2016, the Centre comprises 12 labs whose research feeds into the mission of understanding how the brain generates behaviour. SWC is led by Director Professor Tom Mrsic-Flogel, Associate Director Professor Troy Margrie, and Chief Scientific Officer Professor Tom Otis.

History and funding 
Conceptualised by Lord David Sainsbury in partnership with the Wellcome Trust, SWC was officially opened on 23 May 2016 by Nobel Laureate Professor Eric Kandel. SWC was established by inaugural Director and Nobel Laureate John O’Keefe with funding from the Gatsby Charitable Foundation and Wellcome Trust.

In October 2016, Professor Tom Mrsic-Flogel was appointed as the new Director of the Sainsbury Wellcome Centre.

Building design 

The building was designed by Ian Ritchie of Ian Ritchie Architects. The design of the labs and common areas was based on the feedback and observations from leading neuroscience research institutes around the world. The core of the building houses the Gatsby Computational Neuroscience Unit, a computational neuroscience research unit that collaborates closely with SWC.

Research focus 
Research at SWC is focused on systems neuroscience. SWC’s mission is to understand how neural circuits produce flexible, complex behaviours. The Centre comprises 12 research groups, made up of postdoctoral researchers, PhD students, research assistants, and some Master’s students. They are led by the following experimental neuroscientists:

 Dr Athena Akrami
 Professor Tiago Branco
 Dr Claudia Clopath (part-time)
 Dr Chunyu Ann Duan
 Dr Jeffrey Erlich
 Professor Sonja Hofer
 Dr Yoh Isogai
 Professor Troy Margrie
 Professor Tom Mrsic-Flogel
 Professor John O’Keefe
 Dr Andrew Saxe
 Dr Marcus Stephenson-Jones

Researchers work closely with the Gatsby Computational Neuroscience Unit to bridge theoretical and experimental neuroscience.

Scientific accomplishments 
In November 2017, a new device called Neuropixels was announced that records from hundreds of brain cells simultaneously. SWC was involved in a collaboration to develop the Neuropixels probes with scientists at HHMI Janelia Research Campus, the Allen Institute for Brain Science and UCL, and engineers at imec.

In September 2018, Professor John O’Keefe spoke at the Schrödinger at 75 conference about his lab’s work to develop simple tests of spatial awareness that could allow doctors to detect early signs of Alzheimer’s disease.

In December 2020, SWC scientists developed a brain machine interface (BMI) that allowed mice to learn to guide a cursor using only their brain. This research could be applied to improve human BMIs in the future.

In July 2021, SWC Group Leader Athena Akrami and the Patient Led Research Collaborative published the largest international study of Long COVID to date which identified over 200 symptoms across 10 organ systems. The researchers called for a national screening programme for those with long Covid symptoms.

Education 
The Sainsbury Wellcome Centre runs a four-year PhD programme taught by faculty at SWC, the Gatsby Computational Neuroscience Unit, and affiliated institutions including UCL.

Governing board 
SWC Governing Board is chaired by Sir Malcolm Grant, other voting members are Professor Carol Barnes, Peter Hesketh, Professor Robert Kass, Professor Tony Movshon, Professor Geraint Rees, Dr Andrew Welchman.

References

External links 
 Official website
 Ian Ritchie Studios: Sainsbury Wellcome Centre
 British Neuroscience Association: Sainsbury Wellcome Centre
 University College London: Sainsbury Wellcome Centre
 Gatsby Charitable Foundation: Sainsbury Wellcome Centre
 UCL Faculty of Life Sciences Academic Divisions

Neuroscience research centres in the United Kingdom
University College London